The Bartini T-117, was a twin-engined cargo aircraft designed by Robert Ludvigovich Bartini in the USSR from 1944-1948.

Development
From 1944 to 1948 Bartini devoted much effort to the development of the T-117 heavy transport aircraft. Work on the project started whilst Bartini was working at TsKB 29 NKVD as a detainee.

A peculiarity of the project was the fuselage of elliptical cross-section with the larger axis horizontal. Because of the wide fuselage, it was possible to transport two GAZ-67 jeeps side by side. Alternatively, 80 troops could be carried on 4 lengthwise rows of seats.

Construction of a prototype started in 1946, but in 1948 work was halted due to a shortage of ASh-7 engines which were needed for the Tupolev Tu-4 strategic bomber, which had been given priority on the personal directive of Joseph Stalin. There were several projected variants of the T-117 with alternative powerplants, including the Shvetsov ASh-82FN, the experimental Shvetsov ASh-2 four-row radial and the  Klimov VK-2 turboprop, but this did not save the project. The uncompleted T-117 prototype never had engines fitted and was scrapped.

Specifications

See also 
 Antonov An-8
 Bartini Stal-6
 Bartini Stal-7
 Bartini Beriev VVA-14

References

Further reading

External links
 Frontal Picture of the T-117
 Pictures of the T-117

1940s Soviet experimental aircraft
T-117
OOS aircraft